The 184th New York State Legislature, consisting of the New York State Senate and the New York State Assembly, met from January 7, 1981, to December 31, 1982, during the seventh and eighth years of Hugh Carey's governorship, in Albany.

Background
Under the provisions of the New York Constitution of 1938 and the U.S. Supreme Court decision to follow the One man, one vote rule, re-apportioned in 1971, and amended in 1974, by the Legislature, 60 Senators and 150 assemblymen were elected in single-seat districts for two-year terms. Senate and Assembly districts consisted of approximately the same number of inhabitants, the area being apportioned contiguously without restrictions regarding county boundaries.

At this time there were two major political parties: the Republican Party and the Democratic Party. The Liberal Party, the Conservative Party, the Right to Life Party, the Libertarian Party, the Communist Party, the Workers World Party and the Socialist Workers Party also nominated tickets.

Elections
The New York state election, 1980, was held on November 4. The only statewide elective office up for election was a U.S. Senator from New York. Republican Al D'Amato was elected with Conservative and Right to Life endorsement. The approximate party strength at this election, as expressed by the vote for U.S. Senator, was: Republicans 2,272,000; Democrats 2,619,000; Liberals 665,000; Conservatives 275,000; Right to Life 152,000; Libertarians 21,500; Communists 4,000; Workers World 3,500; and Socialist Workers 3,000.

Twelve of the thirteen women members of the previous legislature—State Senators Carol Berman (Dem.), of Lawrence; Mary B. Goodhue (Rep.), a lawyer of Mount Kisco; Olga A. Méndez (Dem.), of East Harlem, and Linda Winikow (Dem.), of Spring Valley; and Assemblywomen Elizabeth Connelly (Dem.), of Staten Island; Pinny Cooke (Rep.), of Rochester; Joan B. Hague (Rep.), of Glens Falls; Rhoda S. Jacobs (Dem.), of Brooklyn; and Gerdi E. Lipschutz (Dem.), of Queens; May W. Newburger (Dem.), of Great Neck; Toni Rettaliata (Rep.), of Huntington; and Florence M. Sullivan (Rep.), a lawyer of Brooklyn—were re-elected. Geraldine L. Daniels (Dem.), of the Bronx; Gloria Davis (Dem.), of the Bronx; Eileen C. Dugan (Dem.), of Brooklyn; Gail S. Shaffer (Dem.), of North Blenheim; Carol A. Siwek (Rep.), of Buffalo; and Helene Weinstein (Dem.), a lawyer of Brooklyn; were also elected to the Assembly.

The New York state election, 1981, was held on November 3. No statewide elective offices were up for election. One vacancy each in the State Senate and the Assembly were filled.

On April 20, 1982, Aurelia Greene (Dem.), of the Bronx, was elected to fill a vacancy in the Assembly. Thus the 184th Legislature finished having 19 women members, surpassing the previous record of 13 in the 183rd New York State Legislature (1979–1980).

Sessions
The Legislature met for the first regular session (the 204th) at the State Capitol in Albany on January 7, 1981; and recessed indefinitely on July 10.

Stanley Fink (Dem.) was re-elected Speaker.

Warren M. Anderson (Rep.) was re-elected Temporary President of the State Senate.

The Legislature met again on September 16, 1981, to enact amendments to the election laws, concerning the primary elections in New York City.

The Legislature met again from October 26 to 30, 1981, to consider welfare and tax matters.

The Legislature met again on December 3, 1981, to override Governor Carey's veto of a new property tax bill.

The Legislature met for the second regular session (the 205th) at the State Capitol in Albany on January 6, 1982; and recessed indefinitely on July 3.

On March 26, 1982, a special panel of federal judges, consisting of Lawrence W. Pierce, Robert J. Ward and Vincent L. Broderick, ordered the Legislature to re-apportion the legislative districts by April 16.

On April 19, the federal judges noted that the Legislature had not agreed upon a re-apportionment, and announced that they would appoint somebody to elaborate a proposal.

On May 8, Senate Republicans and Assembly Democrats announced that they had agreed upon a new apportionment. The number of seats in the State Senate was increased from 60 to 61. The new district lines were gerrymandered by the Republican Senate majority to increase Republican strength, and by the Democratic Assembly majority to increase Democratic strength.

On June 23, the feral judges ordered Special Master Robert P. Patterson Jr. to revise the new apportionment proposed by the Legislature.

On July 3, the revised re-apportionment was approved by the U.S. Department of Justice.

The Legislature met for a special session from December 13 to 22, 1982, to consider again measures to balance the budget and to keep the mass transit fare in New York City down.

State Senate

Senators
The asterisk (*) denotes members of the previous Legislature who continued in office as members of this Legislature. L. Paul Kehoe changed from the Assembly to the Senate.

Note: For brevity, the chairmanships omit the words "...the Committee on (the)..."

Employees
 Secretary: Roger C. Thompson (1981)
Stephen F. Sloan (1982)

State Assembly

Assemblymen
The asterisk (*) denotes members of the previous Legislature who continued in office as members of this Legislature.

Note: For brevity, the chairmanships omit the words "...the Committee on (the)..."

Employees
 Clerk: Catherine A. Carey

Notes

Sources
 List of state legislators in The Public Sector (Vol. 3, No. 32; issue of May 12, 1981;

; pg. 4)
 New faces appear on Albany scene in the Finger Lake Times, of Geneva, on January 6, 1982
 DEMOCRATS WIN 3 RACES IN LEGISLATIVE ELECTIONS by Frank Lynn, in The New York Times on April 21, 1982

184
1981 in New York (state)
1982 in New York (state)
1981 U.S. legislative sessions
1982 U.S. legislative sessions